Publius Cornelius Cossus was a consular tribune of the Roman Republic in 415 BC.

Cornelius belonged to the Cornelia gens, one of the early Republics most influential patrician families which branch, the Cossi, rose to prominence during the late 5th century BC. Cornelius was the son of a Aulus Cornelius, possibly the quaestor Aulus Cornelius in 459, the famous Aulus Cornelius Cossus, consul in 428 BC, or another otherwise unattested Aulus Cornelius.

Career 
In 415 BC, Cornelius was elected as one of the Consular tribunes, his colleagues were Numerius Fabius Vibulanus, Gaius Valerius Potitus Volusus and Quintus Quinctius Cincinnatus. The actions of the consulars of this year is little known, but there was a proposal by the plebeian tribune Lucius Decius to colonize Bolae which was vetoed.

See also

References 

5th-century BC Romans
Roman Republic
Roman consular tribunes
Cornelii